NLA may refer to:
 NLA, the IATA code for Simon Mwansa Kapwepwe International Airport in Ndola, Zambia
 National Language Authority, a regulatory institution of Urdu language in Pakistan
 National League A, the premier ice hockey league in Switzerland
 National Leather Association International, a BDSM organization based in the United States
 National Liberation Army (disambiguation)
 Network Level Authentication, in computing, a user authorizing technology
 Newspaper Licensing Agency, a newspaper licensing organization in the United Kingdom
 Numerical linear algebra, the study of algorithms for performing linear algebra computations
 Boeing New Large Airplane, a defunct airplane project
 National Lipid Association, an American association of healthcare providers dedicated to improve lipid management in clinical medicine

Libraries 
 Nebraska Library Association
 Nevada Library Association

National libraries 
 National Library of Afghanistan, based in Kabul University prior to its destruction in a civil war.
 National Library of Agriculture, more accurately known as the United States National Agricultural Library
 National Library of Albania
 National Library of Aleppo
 National Library of Algeria
 National Library of Andorra, more accurately known as the Andorra National Library
 National Library of Angola
 National Library of Argentina, more accurately known as the Mariano Moreno National Library of the Argentine Republic
 National Library of Armenia
 National Library of Aruba
 National Library of Australia
 National Library of Austria, more accurately known as the Austrian National Library
 National Library of Azerbaijan

See also 
 National Library of Antigua and Barbuda, more accurately known as the Antigua Public Library